Jaime is the debut solo studio album from Brittany Howard, released on September 20, 2019, via ATO Records. It has received acclaim from critics and has been nominated for several awards; it was a moderate sales success, appearing on several charts. The album is a mix of several musical styles that reflects intimate events and perspectives in Howard's life, which she supported with her first solo tour.

Recording 

The album is the first solo work from Howard, who has previously recorded with Alabama Shakes. It is dedicated to her sister Jaime, who died of retinoblastoma as a teen. After experiencing writer's block, Howard put Alabama Shakes on hold to pursue side projects and to have complete control over the recording of Jaime in 2018. After taking a long road trip, she reflected on her life as her 30th birthday approached and decided to record an album that explored her personal history and beliefs. In addition to discussing the death of her sister, the album explores growing up poor, the prejudice that her parents faced as an interracial couple and her struggle with religious faith. She began recording the songs in a greenhouse in Topanga, California before heading to two Los Angeles-based studios to finalize the album.

Musical style 
Jaime has an eclectic style that features elements of synth-rock, blues rock, neo soul, experimental music, psychedelia, soul, gospel, funk, hip hop, contemporary R&B, electronic music, retro-soul, jazz fusion, spoken word, avant-jazz, new age, trap, noise rock, funkadelia, alternative country, power pop, and doo-wop.

According to Ann Powers of Slate, the music is a departure from the revivalist rock of Alabama Shakes, instead exploring a cross between jazz, funk, and soul. Writing for Uproxx, Steven Hyden says Howard abandons typical rock-band dynamics in favor of "darker, weirder, groovier, and more psychedelic" sounds, making it difficult to categorize the album simply as rock, R&B, or jazz. On the other hand, Consequence of Sound explicitly classifies Jaime as a synth-rock album. Pitchforks Sheldon Pearce also observes synth-rock, although in rapid form among other elements, such as experimental psychedelic funk, old school hip hop breakbeats, and tight jazz sounds reminiscent of D'Angelo's 2014 album Black Messiah; his colleague Jillian Mapes also compares the work to D'Angelo as well as Prince and The Roots.

"13th Century Metal" is an avant-jazz and spoken word song that dives into "brilliant" noise rock later on.

Marketing
The release was accompanied by three singles: "History Repeats" on June25, 2019; "Stay High" on June16, 2019; and "He Loves Me" on January20, 2020.

Howard also embarked on her first solo tour in promotion of the album. On the road, she and her backing band eschewed Alabama Shakes songs and only performed works from this album and her other bands.

August 17: Asheville, North Carolina – Orange Peel
August 18: Asheville, North Carolina – Orange Peel
August 19: Nashville, Tennessee – Ryman Auditorium
August 23: Washington, D.C. – 9:30 Club
August 24: Washington, D.C. – 9:30 Club
September 18: Milwaukee, Wisconsin – Riverside Theater
September 19: St. Paul, Minnesota – Palace Theatre
September 20: Chicago, Illinois – Riviera Theatre
September 22: Toronto, Ontario – Rebel
September 24: New York City, New York – Beacon Theatre
September 25: Boston, Massachusetts – House of Blues
September 27: Philadelphia, Pennsylvania – The Fillmore
October 5: Austin, Texas – ACL Festival
October 8: Los Angeles, California – Theatre at Ace Hotel
October 9: Los Angeles, California – Theatre at Ace Hotel
October 12: Austin, Texas – ACL Festival
October 13: Atlanta, Georgia – AfroPunk Festival

Howard also performed a set for NPR's Tiny Desk Concert series and made promotional appearances on Jimmy Kimmel Live! in 2019 and The Tonight Show with Jimmy Fallon and Today in 2020. Planned 2020 performances were canceled or rescheduled due to the COVID-19 pandemic.

Music videos for "Stay High" and "He Loves Me" were released, with the former featuring Terry Crews lip syncing the song.

Reception

 AnyDecentMusic? characterized the critical consensus of 20sources as an 8.2 out of 10 and Album of the Year gave it an 83 out of 100, with 20reviews.

Reviewing for Uproxx, Hyden praised the album for its differences from Howard's previous work and genre-bending mix of funk, jazz, and hip-hop. In Rolling Stone, Jon Dolan highlighted the Southern culture elements of the lyrics and summing up that her lyrics in "Georgia" make a "strikingly bold moment on a record that's full of them". Pitchfork awarded Jaime the distinction of "Best New Music", with Pearce describing it as a "thrilling opus that pushes the boundaries of voice, sound, and soul to new extremes". The Guardians Ben Beaumont-Thomas called it "emotionally as well as musically varied" and concluded that solo projects "are rarely as beautiful as they are here". In Under the Radar, Celine Teo-Blockey found her cross-genre experimentation "stunning". Reviewing for AllMusic, Stephen Thomas Erlewine believed the album will warrant repeated listening, with "subsequent spins... profound and nourishing". In a year-end essay for Slate, Powers cited as Jaime one of her favorite albums from 2019 and proof that the format is not dead but rather undergoing a "metamorphosis". She added that concept albums had reemerged through the culturally-relevant autobiographical narratives of artists such as Howard, whose "stunning" album "went deep to reveal the joys and pain of her experience as an embodiment of that elusive state: intersectionality".

Accolades
The album opener "History Repeats" received two nominations at the 62nd Annual Grammy Awards, for Best Rock Song and Best Rock Performance Both "13th Century Metal" and "Stay High" were included on Pitchfork's list of the best songs of 2019, placing at number 98 and 42 respectively. Howard was nominated for Artist of the Year, Jaime for Album of the Year, and "Stay High" for Song of the Year at the 2020 Americana Music Honors & Awards.

Track listing
All songs written and produced by Brittany Howard, except where noted
"History Repeats" – 3:05
"He Loves Me" – 2:32
"Georgia" – 3:18
"Stay High" – 3:12
"Tomorrow" (Paul Horton, Brittany Howard) – 3:14
"Short and Sweet" – 3:45
"13th Century Metal" (Robert Glasper, Brittany Howard, Nate Smith) – 4:48
"Baby" – 2:27
"Goat Head" – 3:13
"Presence" – 2:47
"Run to Me" – 3:05

Personnel
Brittany Howard– guitar on "History Repeats", "He Loves Me", "Stay High", "Baby", and "Presence"; clavinet on "Georgia"; keyboards on "Georgia" and "Run to Me"; keyboard and string arrangement on "Tomorrow"; vocals; drums on "Tomorrow", "Presence", and "Run to Me"; percussion on "Tomorrow"; bass guitar on "Tomorrow"; production; editing on "13th Century Metal"

Additional musicians
Terry K. Anderson– sermon from Lilly Grove Missionary Baptist Church in Houston, Texas excerpt sampled in "He Loves Me"
Lloyd Buchanan– organ on "Georgia"
Zac Cockrell– bass guitar on "History Repeats", "He Loves Me", "Georgia", "Stay High", "Tomorrow", and "Baby"
Robert Glasper– celesta on "Stay High", keyboards on "13th Century Metal", "Baby", and "Goat Head"
Larry Goldings– keyboards on "Tomorrow"
Paul Horton– clavinet on "History Repeats" and keyboard arrangement on "Tomorrow"
Lavinia Meijer– harp on "Presence"
Rob Moose– strings on "Tomorrow"
Nate Smith– drums on "History Repeats", "He Loves Me", "Georgia", "Stay High", "13th Century Metal", "Baby", "Goat Head", and "Run to Me"; vibraphone on "Baby"; percussion on "Goat Head"

Technical personnel
Chris Bellman– lacquer cutting
Christopher Cerulo– engineering assistance
Danny Clinch– photography
Shawn Everett– engineering, mixing, mastering at United Recording and Subtle McNugget in Los Angeles
Brantley Gutierrez– photography
Michael Harris– engineering assistance
Bob Ludwig– mastering input
Scott Moore– mixing assistance
Vlad Sepetov– art direction
Ivan Wayman– mixing assistance

Charts

Weekly charts

Year-end charts

Jaime (Reimagined)

Jaime (Reimagined) is the first remix album by American musician Brittany Howard. The album collects remixes of songs from her 2019 debut studio album Jaime. It was released digitally on July 23, 2021, by ATO Records, with vinyl copies shipping in September 2021. Three of the album's remixes appeared on the Jaime (The Remixes) EP released in 2020.

At the 2022 Libera Awards, Jaime (Reimagined) received a nomination for Best R&B Record. Additionally, album track "Stay High again.." was nominated for Best Dance Record.

Critical reception
Radio station KCRW listed the album as the fifth best of 2021, saying "this collection is pretty much an entirely new album where the versions sound totally different, but with a great deal of respect to the original body of work. Sometimes it's good to be challenged, and Jaime (Reimagined) does just that in a very unique and uplifting way."

Track listing

Charts

Release history

References

External links

Jaime at Rate Your Music

2019 debut albums
Albums produced by Brittany Howard
ATO Records albums
Brittany Howard albums
Albums recorded at Electro-Vox Recording Studios